HMS Somme may refer to:

 was an  launched in 1918 and sold in 1932.
 HMS Somme was a  laid down in 1945 and cancelled later that year

Royal Navy ship names